Tru Thoughts is a British independent record label founded in Brighton in 1999 by Robert Luis and Paul Jonas.
Since the acclaimed first album release of Bonobo's debut Animal Magic, the label has put out over 200 LPs, across genres from electronic, funk, soul and hip hop to jazz, tropical, grime and more. 
It has developed a reputation for releasing a wide variety of high-quality music.

Will Holland, widely known as Quantic, has released under a number of monikers on the label; including projects such as Quantic, The Quantic Soul Orchestra, Flowering Inferno, The Limp Twins, Quantic and his Combo Barbaro and his collaborations with Alice Russell and Nidia Gongora.

History
In September 1999, after the success of their club nights "Phonic: hoop" and "Shake Yer Wig", Paul Jonas & Robert Luis, two music-obsessed friends, decided to launch their own label. From the improvised 'office', under Robert Luis' stairs, the new Tru Thoughts records started its history with their first 12" EP Alarming Frequency. There followed many releases which organically built on the success of the label, including Bonobo's Animal Magic (July 2000), Quantic's The 5th Exotic (June 2001), TM Juke's Maps from the Wilderness (October 2003), Alice Russell's Under The Munka Moon (July 2004) and Nostalgia 77's The Garden (March 2005).

In 2005 Tru Thoughts were awarded Label Of The Year at the annual Gilles Peterson Worldwide Awards.

Other long-term signings followed from further afield, including London trio Belleruche; Lance Ferguson from Melbourne, Australia (with his various guises including The Bamboos (funk band), Lanu, Menagerie and the production of Kylie Auldist); New Orleans’ Hot 8 Brass Band; and Edinburgh's Hidden Orchestra. 2009 saw Tru Thoughts marked their 10th anniversary with a 3-disc compilation and the label being described as one of the UK's best independents.

As time has gone on, the label has released music from an increasingly global roster, including the music of Moonchild, Space Captain, Youngblood Brass Band, The Seshen and Lost Midas from the US; Kinny, of Native Canadian and Jamaican heritage and based in Norway; Brazilians Drumagick and Saravah Soul; Japan's Anchorsong; and more from the UK, including Maddslinky aka Zed Bias, Flowdan, Hint, Zero dB, Omar, Wrongtom, Riz MC, Harleighblu, Ty and Rodney P/London Posse.

In 2017, Tru Thoughts celebrated their 18th birthday with an all-day event at London's famous Roundhouse venue, which featured appearances from Quantic, Alice Russell, the Hot 8 Brass Band, Anchorsong and Rodney P.

Recent successes include the release of Quantic's critically acclaimed ‘Atlantic Oscillations’; Moonchild being named Jazz FM's Soul Act Of The Year 2018 and their subsequent Tiny Desk session featuring tracks from their latest release, Little Ghost; Hot 8 Brass Band's twice sold-out shows at London's Roundhouse and Brit Awards 2019 performance alongside George Ezra; and Anchorsong's Ceremonial placing at #5 in BBC 6Music's Album Of The Year 2016 list and Cohesion being named Album Of The Day in 2018.

The label has worked with an impressive list of collaborators and remixers over the years, including Skream, Stevie Wonder, Daedelus, Cut Chemist, Aloe Blacc, MJ Cole, Beth Rowley, Toddla T, Prins Thomas, Clark, Sam Sparro, Falty dL, Flux Pavilion, Rizzle Kicks, Megan Washington, Tim Rogers, Roy Ayers, True Tiger, Tawiah, Common, Angie Stone, Maxi Jazz, Adrian Utley and many more. Tru Thoughts has also discovered various notable artists who subsequently signed to other record labels; Bonobo signed to Ninja Tune, Chris Clark signed to Warp Records, Jon Kennedy to Grand Central Records, Chroma to LTJ Bukem's Good Looking Records and The Capoeira Twins signed to Timo Maas' Hope Recordings.

Tru Thoughts has a publishing company called Full Thought Publishing. The music from the label has been used on adverts for iTunes, Ford, MLB, Mercedes Benz, and Unilever and appeared on numerous films and TV programs including Mad Men, Big Little Lies and Netflix's Sex Education.

From 2018, the company's releases are distributed in the United States by Redeye Distribution.

Tru Thoughts organizes many club nights between Brighton and London, and broadcasts on several radio stations.

Subsidiary labels
 "Unfold records", compilation releases
 "Zebra Traffic", UK hip hop

Artists

 Abi Flynn
 Alice Russell
 Anchorsong
 Animanz
 Aurora Dee Raynes
 Azaxx
 The Amalgamation Of Soundz
 The Bamboos
 Barakas
 Belleruche
 benji Boko
 Beta Hector
 Bonobo
 Bryony Jarman-Pinto
 The Broken Keys
 Capoeira Twins
 Carolina Lins & Os Planatos
 Deeds Plus Thoughts
 Diesler
 Domu
 Flevans
 Flowdan
 Freddie Cruger & Anthony Mills Are Wildcookie
 Freddie Cruger a.k.a. Red Astaire
 Galaxian
 Gawd Status
 Hidden Orchestra
 Hint
 Hot 8 Brass Band
 Humble Munk
 Irah X Abstrakt Sonance
 J-Felix
 Jon Kennedy
 Jumbonics
 Jung Collective
 Kingdem (Rodney P, Ty, Blak Twang)
 Kinny
 Kinny & Horne
 Kylie Auldist
 Lanu
 Lightning Head
 The Limp Twins
 Lakuta
 Lizzy Parks
 London Posse
 Maddslinky
 Maga Bo
 Magic Drum Orchestra
 Mangataot
 Manu Delago
 Mark de Clive-Lowe
 Mawglee
 Me&You
 Milez Benjiman
 Moonchild (band)
 Natural Self
 Nikitch & Kuna Maze
 Nirobi & Barakas
 Nonames
 Nostalgia 77
 Nostalgia 77 Octet
 Nostalgia 77 Sessions feat. Keith and Julie Tippett
 Quantic
 Quantic and his Combo Bárbaro
 Quantic & Nidia Gongora
 Quantic Presenta Flowering Inferno
 The Quantic Soul Orchestra
 Peshay
 Pieces of a Man
 Rabii Harnoune & V.B. Kühl
 Riz MC
 Rhi
 Rodney P
 Saravah Soul
 Sefi Zisling
 The Seshen
 Sharky
 Slowe
 Sly5thAve
 Spanky Wilson
 Space Captain band
 Steady
 Steven Bamidele
 Stonephace
 Strategy
 sUb modU
 Te'Amir
 Terror Danjah
 Tiawa
 TM Juke
 TM Juke And The Jack Baker Trio
 Treva Whateva
 Unforscene
 Uniting of Opposites
 Unitone
 Werkha
 WheelUP
 Wrongtom
 Wrongtom meets the Ragga Twins
 Youngblood Brass Band
 Zed Bias
 Zero dB

Discography

Compilation albums
 When Shapes Join Together (25 October 1999, cat. no: TRU002)
 When Shapes Join Together 2 (28 January 2002, cat. no: TRU026)
 Heavyweight Rib Ticklers (compiled by Mr. Scruff, 11 February 2002, cat. no: UNFOLDCD001)
 Phonic Hoop (compiled by Robert Luis, 18 July 2002, cat. no: UNFOLDCD002)
 When Shapes Join Together 3 (21 October 2002, cat. no: TRUCD035)
 Vocalise (compiled by Robert Luis, 11 November 2002, cat. no: UNFOLDCD003)
 Mono – When Shapes Join Together Mix (compiled by Quantic, 5 April 2003, cat. no: TRUCD044)
 Shapes One Horizontal & Vertical CD (1 September 2003, cat. no: TRUCD045)
 Shapes Yellow (2 November 2004, cat. no: TRU/ZEB002)
 Shapes Red (6 June 2005, cat. no: TRUCD091)
 Shapes Compilation (26 March 2006, cat. no: TRUCD101)
 Shapes Compilation (11 September 2006, cat. no: TRUCD111)
 Shapes 07:01 All New Amazing Sounds (6 March 2007, cat. no: TRUCD122)
 Shapes 07:02 All New Amazing Sounds (5 Novembre 2007, cat. no: TRUCD122)
 Shapes 08:01 (2 June 2008, cat. no: TRUCD164)
 Shapes 08:02 (20 October 2008, cat. no: TRUCD181)

Tru Thoughts 10th Anniversary (19 October 2009, cat. no: TRUCD200) 

 Disc 1 (downtempo)
 Bonobo – Terrapin
 Nostalgia 77 – Quiet Dawn feat. Beth Rowley
 Alice Russell – Hurry On Now feat. TM Juke
 Natural Self – The Rising feat. Andreya Triana
 Milez Benjiman – Chop That Wood
 Hint – One Woman Army feat. Laura Vane
 Quantic & Nickodemus feat. Tempo & The Candela Allstars – Mi Swing Es Tropical
 Bonobo – Kota
 Lizzy Parks – Raise The Roof
 The Limp Twins – Sunday Driver
 Hot 8 Brass Band – What's My Name? (Rock With The Hot 8)
 Flevans – The Notion feat. Sweet Laredo
 The Nostalgia 77 Octet – Musical Silt
 Quantic Presenta Flowering Inferno – Ciudad Del Swing
 Kinny – Desire feat. Nostalgia 77
 Freddie Cruger a.k.a. Red Astaire – Pushing On feat. Linn

 Disc 2 (club)
 Saravah Soul – Nao Possa Te Levar A Serio
 The Quantic Soul Orchestra – Super 8
 The Bamboos – Step It Up feat. Alice Russell
 Quantic – Transatlantic
 TM Juke – Come Away feat. Sophie Faricy
 Lanu – Dis-Information
 Natural Self – Shake Down
 Belleruche – Northern Girls
 Alice Russell – All Over Now
 Quantic – Mishaps Happening (Prins Thomas edit)
 Nirobi & Barakas – Bungee Jump Against Racism
 TM Juke & The Jack Baker Trio – Party Favours feat. Gecko Turner
 Kylie Auldist – Community Service Announcement
 Quantic – Don't Joke With A Hungry Man feat. Spanky Wilson
 Me&You – The Hoop Loop
 The Broken Keys – The Witch

 Disc 3 (exclusives)
 Quantic Presenta Flowering Inferno – Time Is The Enemy
 Domu – We Can
 Flevans – The Second Bite
 Azaxx – Disco Bimbo
 Hint – Tape Packs
 Quantic – Only a Little While Here
 Saravah Soul – Alforria
 The Bamboos – Turn It Up feat. Lyrics Born
 Freddie Cruger a.k.a. Red Astaire – Boogie Down Hagsätra
 Barakas – Spitfire
 Stonephace – Singularity
 Kylie Auldist – No Use (Acoustic Version)

 Shapes 09:01 (8 June 2009, cat. no: TRUCD194)
 Unfold Presents Tru Thoughts Covers (7 September 2009, cat. no: UNFOLDCD007)
 Shapes 10:01 (12 April 2010, cat. no: TRUCD212)
 Tru Thoughts Compilation (6 September 2010, cat. no: TRUCD216)
 Shapes 10:02 (6 December 2010, cat. no: TRUCD226)
 Shapes 11:01 (6 October 2011, cat. no: TRUCD 239)
 When Shapes Mix Together (21 November 2011, cat. no: TRUCD244)
 Tru Thoughts Disco/Boogie (22 October 2012)
 Shapes 12:01 (3 December 2012, cat. no: TRUCD264)
 Shapes Circles (27 August 2013, cat. no: TRUCD280)
 Shapes Rectangles (30 June 2014, cat. no: TRUCD293)
 Tru Thoughts Anniversary (16 October 2014, cat. no: TRU300)
 Shapes Wires (30 March 2015, cat. no: TRUCD303)
 Tru Thoughts Covers 2 (8 August 2015, cat. no: TRUCD308)
 Shapes: In Space (5 August 2016, cat. no: TRUCD329)
 Shapes Kaleidoscope (11 August 2017)
 Tru Thoughts 18 (21 October 2017, cat. no: TRU351)
 Shapes: Mountains (12 October 2018 cat. no: TRU360)

See also
 List of record labels
 List of independent UK record labels

References

External links
 Official site
 Tru Thoughts Obsession

Record labels established in 1999
British independent record labels
Electronic dance music record labels
Electronic music record labels
British hip hop record labels
British companies established in 1999